Christine Lee is an English medical researcher. She is Emerita Professor of Haemophilia at the University of London, and founding Editor of Haemophilia. She trained in medicine at Somerville College, Oxford, where she was awarded First Class Honours and was the first female scholar of the Oxford University Medical School. She was awarded a Doctorate of Science (Medicine) by the University of London in 1996.

Evidence to the Infected Blood Inquiry
Over two days, 20-21 October 2020, Professor Lee gave evidence in person to the Infected Blood Inquiry. On the second day of her evidence, whilst addressing questions about an Oral History Transcript (THOM0000001), Lee told the inquiry that what she did not "like about the idea of compensation", was that "it suggests liability", but went on to qualify that she believed those who were providing treatment at the time were "doing their best".

Notes

External links 

 

Living people
Year of birth missing (living people)
British medical researchers
Alumni of the University of London
Alumni of Somerville College, Oxford
Alumni of St George's, University of London
Academics of the University of London